Triad is an outdoor sculpture by German American artist Evelyn Franz, located in Laurelhurst Park in southeast Portland, Oregon.

Description and history

Originally completed in 1980 and remade in 2003, Triad was designed by Evelyn Franz, who received her Master of Fine Arts in Sculpture in 1976 from Portland State University. The abstract stainless steel sculpture was funded by the Comprehensive Employment and Training Act (CETA) and is installed between Southeast 37th Avenue and Southeast Ankeny in Laurelhurst Park. According to the Regional Arts & Culture Council, which administers the work, it measures ,  x ,  x , . The Smithsonian Institution lists the measurements as approximately  x  x . The sculpture contains no inscriptions and rests on a stainless steel base which measures approximately  x  x . It is part of the City of Portland and Multnomah County Public Art Collection courtesy of the Regional Arts & Culture Council.

Its condition was deemed "treatment needed" by the Smithsonian's "Save Outdoor Sculpture!" program in November 1994.

See also

 1980 in art
 2003 in art

References

External links
 Triad at the Public Art Archive

1980 establishments in Oregon
1980 sculptures
2003 establishments in Oregon
Abstract sculptures in Oregon
Laurelhurst, Portland, Oregon
Outdoor sculptures in Portland, Oregon
Sculptures by American artists
Southeast Portland, Oregon
Stainless steel sculptures in Oregon
Works by German people